Whinston is a surname. Notable people with the surname include:

 Andrew B. Whinston (born 1936), American economist and computer scientist
 Michael Whinston (born 1959), American economist

See also
 Winston (disambiguation)
 Winston (name)